A Tale of Winter (released in the United Kingdom as A Winter's Tale) is a 1992 French drama film written and directed by Éric Rohmer, and starring Charlotte Véry, Frédéric van den Driessche, Hervé Furic and Michael Voletti. It is the second instalment in  Rohmer's "Contes des quatre saisons" ("Tales of the Four Seasons") series, which also include A Tale of Springtime (1990), A Summer's Tale (1996) and Autumn Tale (1998). The film was entered into the 42nd Berlin International Film Festival.

Synopsis
Prologue

During her summer holidays at the French coast, young Félicie falls in love and has a romantic relationship with a young and handsome cook named Charles. Unfortunately, Charles is planning to go work in the United States in the Fall. Before they leave on their separate ways, Félicie gives Charles her contact information at the train station. Nervous, and unsure of the address of the new development she is moving into, she writes the wrong town and consequently, they lose contact with each other.

Main Synopsis

5 years later, Félicie is raising Charles' daughter, Élise, in Paris with her mother. It's the winter holiday season now and while still maintains the slim hope that one day she'll meet Charles again, she continues her daily life as a hair stylist in a salon managed by an older man, Maxence. We soon discover that Maxence and Félicie are having an affair, even though he is already in a long-term relationship. Concurrently, she also is having a relationship with a librarian named Loïc who is similar in age to Charles. As the time has progressed, Félicie knows that she needs to commit to one of these eligible suitors, though admitting she is not attracted to either of them.

As an attempted final decision she decides to follow Maxence to the french city of Nevers where the salon franchise has a new managerial role waiting for him. On her arrival, there is no one there to meet Félicie and Élise at the station and begrudgingly has to make her own way to Maxence's new salon. Maxence is very matter-of-fact on her appearance and over time it becomes obvious that the relationship is viewed more as a working arrangement than romantic. While Félicie works,  Élise languishes in the upstairs apartment and Maxence does not appear very fatherly or sympathetic. Between the spare accommodations and the lack of emotional support, Félicie decides the decision was a huge mistake days after her arrival. She announces her dissatisfaction and intent to leave Nevers. Maxence makes various half-hearted gestures to change her mind but it becomes clear that his interest was in her value only as an employee.

After her return to Paris, she rekindles her relationship with Loïc. As usual, Félicie is quite frank about her lack of attraction to him. The couple often functions more as a brother-sister relationship but it seems healthy and better for Élise, who likes Loïc much more than Maxence.  As an intellectual, Loïc is much better suited for Félicie, and they attend Shakepeare's The Winter's Tale, which has several ironical similarities to Félicie's circumstances in life. She is moved to tears by the character of Queen Hermione, and realizes that neither man is going to satisfy her romantically. On New Year's Day, she decides to just go home with Élise and not spend the evening with Loïc - again being quite frank and open about her lack of interest in him as a life partner.

On the bus ride home, she sits across a couple. The man appears to recognize Félicie immediately and it is Charles. In fact, even Élise recognizes Charles from photos. After a brief conversation about how they lost contact with each other, Félicie spontaneously darts out of the bus. Charles chases after her and she explains that it's too stressful to see him with the other woman left on the bus.

The movie ends on a high note as Félicie's adherence to faith and destiny is rewarded. The family is seen at New Year's Dinner with extended relatives and he fits in naturally.

Cast

Themes
A watershed moment for Félicie in the film is the viewing of The Winter's Tale during her brief relationship with Loïc; specifically the predicament of Queen Hermione, who has been accused of having an illegitimate daughter with another man, is put on trial and flees to Bohemia. Hermione who perishes of a broken heart, is resurrected by the forgiveness of the King when he sees her statue begin to come alive. As a metaphor for Félicie's stunted life, Rohmer uses the play's plot of Hermione's statue to make a reference to Félicie's reawakening as a romantic and melting of her practical persona. Both play and movie use the miracle of the reunion as a final plot line.

The scenes of both beach and winter are juxtaposed. The summer setting with bright colors, easy lifestyle representing a flourishing relationship. The city of Paris, in the dead of winter, represents the statue-gray, bundled up, restrained and a complete loss of romantic freedom.

Reception
On the review aggregator website Rotten Tomatoes, the film holds an approval rating of 95% based on reviews from 22 critics, with an average rating of 7.8/10.

Roger Ebert included A Tale of Winter in his "Great Movies" series in 2001, writing, "What pervades Rohmer's work is a faith in love—or, if not love, then in the right people finding each other for the right reasons. There is sadness in his work but not gloom."
Vincent Canby of The New York Times wrote: "At least part of the comic appeal of Mr. Rohmer's work is the complete confidence, clarity and decisiveness with which he dramatizes the utter confusion of his emotionally besieged heroines."
Hal Hinson of The Washington Post called it "a small work, but nearly perfect."

Year-end lists
 Honorable mention – Mike Clark, USA Today

References

External links
 
 
 

1992 films
1992 drama films
1990s French films
1990s French-language films
Films directed by Éric Rohmer
Films produced by Margaret Ménégoz
French drama films